Zuher al-Tbaiti is a Saudi Arabian who was arrested in Morocco in May 2002 as the suspected ringleader of the al-Qaeda plot to bomb American and British vessels transiting the Strait of Gibraltar. He was sentenced to ten years in prison along with two other Saudis, Abdullah al-Ghamdi and Hilal al-Assiri.

Al-Tbaiti served as a military commander in Afghanistan before joining the Bosnian mujahideen as an artillery expert during the Bosnian War in the 1990s. Along with al-Ghamdi and al-Assiri, he escaped Afghanistan in 2001 during the Battle of Tora Bora, and arrived in Morocco.

References

External links
Inside an al-Qaeda Bust
THE REACH OF WAR; U.S. Said to Overstate Value Of Guantánamo Detainees

Saudi Arabian al-Qaeda members
Living people
Prisoners and detainees of Morocco
Year of birth missing (living people)